The 120 members of the third Knesset were elected on 26 July 1955. The breakdown by party was as follows:
Mapai: 40
Herut: 15
General Zionists: 13
National Religious Party: 11
Ahdut HaAvoda: 10
Mapam: 9
Religious Torah Front: 6
Maki: 6
Progressive Party: 5
Democratic List for Israeli Arabs: 2
Progress and Work: 2
Agriculture and Development: 1

List of members

Replacements

External links
Members of the Third Knesset Knesset website

 
03